Aspellinae is a taxonomic subfamily of predatory sea snails, marine gastropod mollusks within the large family Muricidae, the murex snails and rock snails.

Genera
This genera were previously included in the subfamily Muricinae. In 2017 they were brought into this new subfamily by the publication of the "Revised classification, nomenclator and typification of gastropod and monoplacophoran families." by Bouchet P., Rocroi J.P., Hausdorf B., Kaim A., Kano Y., Nützel A., Parkhaev P., Schrödl M. & Strong E.E. 
 Aspella Mörch, 1877
 Attiliosa Emerson, 1968
 Dermomurex Monterosato, 1890
 Ingensia Houart, 2001
Genera brought into synonymy
 Poweria Monterosato, 1884: synonym of Dermomurex Monterosato, 1890 (invalid: junior homonym of Poweria Bonaparte, 1840 [Pisces]; Dermomurex is a replacement name)
 Takia Kuroda, 1953: synonym of Dermomurex (Takia) Kuroda, 1953 represented as Dermomurex Monterosato, 1890 (original rank)
 Trialatella Berry, 1964: synonym of Dermomurex (Trialatella) Berry, 1964 represented as Dermomurex Monterosato, 1890

References

External links

 Keen A.M. (1971). Two new supraspecific taxa in the Gastropoda. The Veliger. 13(3), 296